Central Cemetery of Bogotá is one of the main and most famous cemeteries in Colombia located in Bogotá. Houses several national heroes, poets and former Colombian presidents. It was opened in 1836 and was declared National Monument in 1984. Some of the sculptors of the mausoleums are Tenerani and Sighinolfi.

Pavilion of the Presidents and First Ladies
The cemetery has been the site of many funerals and burials. The presidents buried in the pavilion of the presidents:

Central wing
 Francisco de Paula Santander – First constitutional Colombian president
 Miguel Abadía Méndez – Former president
 Santos Acosta – Former president
 Miguel Antonio Caro – Former president
 Laureano Gómez – Former president
 José Ignacio de Márquez – Former president
 Rafael Reyes – Former president
 Eustorgio Salgar Moreno – Former president
 Eduardo Santos – Former president

Right wing
 Santiago Pérez – Former president
 José Vicente Concha – Former president
 Alfonso López Pumarejo – Former president
 María Michelsen Lombana – First Lady
 Alfonso López Michelsen – Former president
 Cecilia Caballero Blanco – First lady
 Marco Fidel Suárez – Former president
 Carlos Lleras Restrepo – Former president
 Cecilia de la Fuente de Lleras – First lady
 Gustavo Rojas – Former president
 Virgilio Barco Vargas –  Former president
 Carolina Isakson – First lady

Left wing
 Manuel Murillo Toro – Former president
 Enrique Olaya – Former president
 Misael Pastrana Borrero – Former president
 María Cristina Arango – First lady

Notable interments
 Soledad Acosta – Writer and journalist
 Rafael Almansa – Venerated Catholic priest
 Gilberto Alzate Avendaño – Former ambassador to Spain
 José Asunción Silva – poet and writer
 Virgilio Barco Vargas –  Former president
 Miguel Antonio Caro – Former president
 José Vicente Concha – Former president
 José Fernández Madrid – Scientist, writer and statesman
 Luis Carlos Galán – Former candidate for presidency
 Julio Garavito – astronomer
 Álvaro Gómez Hurtado – Former candidate for presidency
 Laureano Gómez – Former president
 León de Greiff – poet and Writer
 Gonzalo Jiménez de Quesada – Founder of Bogota

 Leo Siegfried Kopp – Founder of the Bavaria Beer Company
 Nepomuceno Matallana – serial killer
 Alfonso López Michelsen – Former president
 Alfonso López Pumarejo – Former President
 Jean Marie Marcelin Gilibert – Founder of the National Police of Colombia
 José Ignacio de Márquez – Former president
 Manuel Murillo Toro – Former president
 Enrique Olaya – Former president
 Jaime Pardo Leal – Former candidate for presidency
 Francisco de Paula Santander – First constitutional Colombian president
 Santiago Pérez – Former president
 Carlos Pizarro – Former candidate for presidency
 Rafael Pombo – poet and writer
 Hena Rodríguez – sculptor
 Gustavo Rojas – Former president
 Eustorgio Salgar Moreno – Former president
 Eduardo Santos – Former president
 Oreste Sindici – Composer of the National Anthem of Colombia
 Marco Fidel Suárez – Former president
 Rafael Uribe Uribe – Politician and statesman

References

Further reading
  Calvo Isaza, Oscar Iván (1998), El Cementerio Central: Bogotá, la vida urbana y la muerte. Bogotá: Tercer Milenio Ediciones. 
  Escovar Wilson-White, Alberto (2003), Guía del Cementerio Central de Bogotá. Bogotá: Alcaldía Mayor de Bogotá, Corporación La Candelaria.

External links

 Central Cemetery of Bogota photos and information
 Central Cemetery of Bogota page 
 

Cemeteries in Colombia
Tourist attractions in Bogotá
Buildings and structures in Bogotá
National Monuments of Colombia